Smith Academy, a combination junior and senior high, is a small public school in Hatfield, Massachusetts, United States.

Notable alumni
Jack Hubbard, College Football Hall of Fame inductee
Judy Strong, Olympic field hockey player

References

External links
Smith Academy

Educational institutions established in 1872
Schools in Hampshire County, Massachusetts
Public high schools in Massachusetts
1872 establishments in Massachusetts